Lemuel Stinson (born May 10, 1966) is a former professional American football cornerback in the National Football League (NFL).

Stinson was born in Houston, Texas, where he graduated from Worthing High School. Stinson played in the NFL for six seasons, from 1988 to 1993. He played college football for Texas Tech University for three seasons (1984, 85, 87) as a receiver and cornerback. While at Texas Tech, he also competed in track and field as a hurdler. Stinson was selected in the sixth round of the 1988 NFL Draft by the Chicago Bears, where he played until briefly joining the Atlanta Falcons in 1993, his final season.

While at Texas Tech, he became a member of the Alpha Phi Alpha fraternity.

References

1966 births
Living people
Players of American football from Texas
American football cornerbacks
Texas Tech Red Raiders football players
Chicago Bears players
Atlanta Falcons players
Ed Block Courage Award recipients